Pome County or Bomê County is a county of Nyingchi Prefecture in  the south-east of the Tibet Autonomous Region. Historically known as Powo or Poyul, it was the seat of a quasi-independent kingdom until the early 20th century when troops of the Dalai Lama's Lhasa government integrated it into the central Tibetan realm.
The population was 25,897 in 2004.

Geography 
The region of Powo or Poyul, which is now constituted as the Pome County, lies to the northeast of the Tsangpo gorge, where the Yarlung Tsangpo (Brahmaputra) river turns abruptly to the south on its course towards India.

Two major rivers Yi'ong Tsangpo and Parlung Tsangpo flow into the Pome County from opposite directions to join near Tang-me. The combined river (called Yi'ong Tsangpo) exits the Pome County to the south to join Yarlung Tsangpo near Mount Gyala Peri.

The lower reaches of these two rivers constitute Po-me or Lower Powo.

Po-to or Upper Powo consists of the basin of another river Poto Tsangpo, which originates within the Pome County, along with its tributary Yarlung Chu. Poto Tsangpo joins Parlung Tsangpo to the west of the "Pome Town" (Tramog).

History 
The Kingdom of Powo, or sPo yul (“country of sPo”) was an offshoot of the ancient dynasty of the first Tibetan kings of the Yarlung Valley. Its inhabitants had a reputation as fearsome savages which meant most travellers kept clear of it and so it was one of the least known areas in the Tibetan traditional feudal establishment.

Its isolation was also enhanced by the belief by a great number of Tibetans that in its borders was one of the 'hidden lands' or beyul referred to in the prophecies of Guru Rinpoche. Poba's area of control far exceeded the boundaries of Pome County. The kingdom acted as a protecting power for the streams of Tibetan pilgrims searching for this Promised Land in the East Himalayas from the Lopa tribes (Assam Himalayan tribes) from the mid-seventeenth century. Its power extended south over the Doshong La pass, to include the location of one of these earthly paradises called Padma bkod (written variously Pema köd, Pemakö and Pemako), literally 'Lotus Array', a region in the North-Eastern Province of Upper Siang of Arunachal Pradesh. Accounts of this terrestrial paradise influenced James Hilton's Shangri-La.
A period of instability overtook the kingdom after Chinese incursions in 1905 and 1911. By 1931 the Lhasa government had expelled the last Ka gnam sde pa ('king') and established two garrisons.

Climate
Pome has a monsoon-influenced oceanic climate (Köppen climate classification Cwb).

Settlements
 Alamdo
 Tramog (capital)

Transport 
China National Highway 318

References

Bibliography

External links 
 Pome County, OpenStreetMap, retrieved 21 September 2022.
 Yi'ong Tsangpo basin, Parlung Tsangpo basin, and both the rivers as part of the Yarlung Tsangpo basin, OpenStreetMap, retrieved 21 September 2022.
  Official Website of Pome County
 Pemako trekking holiday, India

Counties of Tibet
Nyingchi